Faizan Khawaja (born 7 January 1986), is a Pakistani American actor and producer.

Early life and career
Faizan Khawaja was born on 7 January 1986 in Houston, United States. His father, Rashid Khawaja, a veteran film and TV producer co-produced Salakhain, and has had minor roles in successful movies like Bol and Actor in Law. He attended early schooling in Houston and then move to India and attended Whistling Woods International Institute where he studied acting and filmmaking and was also trained by Naseeruddin Shah. Faizan moved to Karachi, Pakistan after 2008 Mumbai attacks and began his career as a television actor. He then appeared in many television serials including Mann Ke Moti and Love, Life Aur Lahore. He has also signed a Bollywood film Bankster which is directed by Zeenat Aman's son Azaan Khan. He will also appear in the upcoming comedy-thriller film Chupan Chupai (2016).

Filmography

Television

Film

References

External links

Living people
1986 births
Pakistani male film actors
Pakistani male television actors
Pakistani television producers
Male actors from Houston
Male actors from Karachi
Pakistani diaspora in India
American people of Pakistani descent
Male actors in Urdu cinema